Tobă, "caș de cap de porc" (which means "pig head cheese"), is a kind of a traditional Romanian delicatessen item which looks like a wide sausage, around four inches in diameter, usually using a pig's stomach, stuffed with pork jelly, liver, and skin suspended in aspic.

Notes and references

External links

 

Romanian delicatessen
Romanian sausages
Precooked sausages